Oed-Öhling is a town in the district of Amstetten in Lower Austria in northern Austria. Oed has one primary school.

Geography
Oed-Oehling lies in the Mostviertel in Lower Austria. About 15 percent of the municipality is forested.

Education
The nearest secondary school is in Wallsee.

References

External links 
 www.oed-oehling.at - town website

Cities and towns in Amstetten District